Fernand Baldet (1885–1964) was a French astronomer.

Baldet may also refer to
 Baldet (lunar crater)
 Baldet (Martian crater)